Teachers is an American television sitcom created by and starring The Katydids, which premiered on TV Land on January 13, 2016. The series is based on the web series of the same name and follows a group of teachers at the Chicago-area Fillmore Elementary School. On March 3, 2016, TV Land renewed Teachers for a 20-episode second season, which was split into Winter and Fall segments of 10 episodes each. On April 20, 2017, the show was renewed for a 20-episode third season. The first 10 episodes of season 3 aired from June 5 to August 14, 2018. The remaining 10 episodes aired from January 15 to March 19, 2019.

Series overview

Episodes

Season 1 (2016)

Season 2 (2017–18)

Season 3 (2018–19)

Reception

Ratings

Season 1 (2016)

Season 2 (2017–18)

Season 3 (2018–19)

References

External links
 

Lists of American sitcom episodes